Chinonso Christian Obiozor (born 31 October 1994) is a Nigerian footballer who plays as a forward for Perak FC in Malaysian Super League.

Club career
In February 2022, he joined Shabab Sahel in the Lebanese Premier League, ahead of the second leg of the 2021–22 season.

International career
In January 2014, coach Stephen Keshi, invited him to be a part of the Nigeria 23-man team for the 2014 African Nations Championship. He helped the team defeat Zimbabwe to a third-place finish by a goal to nil.

References

External links 
 
 

1994 births
Living people
Nigerian footballers
Association football forwards
Rangers International F.C. players
Kano Pillars F.C. players
Shabab Al Sahel FC players
Tadamon Sour SC players
Lebanese Premier League players
Nigeria international footballers
2014 African Nations Championship players
Nigerian expatriate footballers
Nigerian expatriate sportspeople in Lebanon
Expatriate footballers in Lebanon
Nigeria A' international footballers
Nigerian expatriate sportspeople in Tunisia
Expatriate footballers in Tunisia
Enyimba F.C. players